The Skydivers is a 1963 American crime film produced by Anthony Cardoza, and written and directed by Coleman Francis. It stars actress Kevin Casey, Eric Tomlin, Cardoza and Marcia Knight, with a performance by influential guitarist Jimmy Bryant.

After falling into obscurity for three decades, the film found second life in 1994, serving the basis for a Mystery Science Theater 3000 episode (during which TV's Frank describes it as like "Manos without the lucid plot").

Plot
Harry and Beth Rowe run a small skydiving facility in an unnamed desert town. One day, a woman named Suzy Belmont comes around claiming to be looking for the Rowes' plane mechanic Frankie Bonner. Beth claims that Frankie was fired for being drunk on the job, but feels that Suzy didn't come down just to see Frankie. As she walks away, Beth can't help but feel that her husband is having an affair with this floozy. It turns out that Harry is, but is still keeping it a secret from his wife. One evening, they receive a letter from Harry's friend, Joe Moss. Joe wants to visit and is looking for a job. Beth comments that Joe could easily fill Frankie's position and Harry consents.

Soon after, Frankie returns to the skydiving school, but Harry catches him trying to sabotage a plane and accosts him. Frankie demands that Harry stay away from Suzy. Harry agrees but warns that he'll break both of Frankie's legs if he ever returns to the facility. Joe Moss eventually arrives and Harry and Beth greet him warmly. Joe is just in time to witness an eager young man, Pete, propose to do a dangerous skydiving stunt. Harry warns that the FAA could come down on them for that, but Pete is determined to prove he can do it. He starts out fine, but before he can pull his chute he panics and plummets to the ground. The FAA does get involved; it shuts down the Rowes' skydiving facility. Harry drives into town and has a beer at a local bar. He finds Suzy outside and fights off her advances before leaving her in the parking lot fuming.

Incensed at Harry, Suzy plots revenge by convincing love-struck Frankie to help her put acid in Harry's parachute. An unsure Frankie gingerly agrees. Eventually, the facility reopens, and numerous people come out to see the skydivers. Trouble brews when Harry thinks Beth and Joe are having an affair; Harry even confronts Joe. Harry and Beth soon make up and Joe backs off. They plan a night jump and a pre-jump party. During the party Suzy and Frankie sneak into the hangar and pour acid on Harry's parachute. The party is lively, but the evening ends in tragedy when Harry's chute rips and he plummets to the ground to his death.

A witness reports seeing Suzy and Frankie running away from the preparations room. Joe gets into his car and soon catches up to them. However, some men from the FAA give chase in a plane and in a car. In spite of the lack of any direct evidence that they were responsible, and no legal proceedings, the two are immediately gunned down without warning by the authorities as they drive away from the facility.

In the aftermath, Joe takes his leave of Beth, who is giving up running the skydiving facility. As Joe drives away, Beth takes her own leave of the facility.

Cast 
 Kevin Casey as Beth Rowe
 Eric Tomlin as Joe Moss
 Anthony Cardoza as Harry Rowe
 Marcia Knight as Suzy Belmont
 Bob Carrano as Bob
 Michael Rae as Red
 Jerry Mann as Bernie
 Keith Walton as Jim the photographer
 Paul Francis as Pete
 Titus Moede as Frankie Bonner
 Jimmy Bryant as himself
 Susan Bay as Woman in bar
 Coleman Francis (uncredited) as Gunman in plane

Home media 
 The MST3K version of the film (accompanied by the uncut version, included as a bonus feature) was released by Rhino Home Video as part of the Collection, Volume 1 DVD set. It was soon re-released by Shout Factory on September 1, 2015.

References

External links
 
The MST3K episode on ShoutFactoryTV
Annotated MST

1963 films
1963 drama films
Parachuting
American aviation films
Crown International Pictures films
Adultery in films
Films about murder
Skydiving in fiction
Films directed by Coleman Francis
1960s rediscovered films
Rediscovered American films
1960s English-language films
1960s American films